Ribagorça or Ribagorza may refer to: 

 Ribagorça or Ribagorza, a historical and natural region of Aragon and Catalonia
 County of Ribagorza or Ribagorça, a medieval county in Spain
 Ribagorza (comarca) or Ribagorça, a territorial unit in modern Aragon, Spain
 Alta Ribagorça, a territorial unit in modern Catalonia, Spain

See also